Gregor Ian Maiden (born 22 July 1979) is a Scottish cricketer who has played first-class, One-Day International and List A cricket for Scotland. He has also played List A and T20 cricket for Lancashire.

Maiden was born in Glasgow and attended Hutchesons' Grammar School, before going on to study at Loughborough University along with fellow Scotland cricketers Fraser Watts and Simon Smith. After three years, he graduated with a 2.1 honours degree in Sports Science.

A frontline batter and off-spin bowler, Gregor had a nomadic club career, having spells with several clubs in the West of Scotland and a brief stint at Lancashire (he suffered a cruciate ligament injury shortly after signing for them), until in 2004 he signed for the popular Grange club in Edinburgh, where he has played since.

In his only List A appearance for Lancashire CCC, in 2003 vs India 'A', his stand of 130 (Maiden scored 62) alongside Chris Schofield created a List A World Record for the Highest 9th Wicket Partnership.  The record has since been beaten by Chris Read and Andrew Harris in 2006.

Gregor can also lay claim to being a genuine all-rounder, as in 2005 he became one of few players in the history of the game to have batted, bowled and kept wicket for his country when he took the gloves for a crucial ICC Intercontinental Cup clash. In the final season of his international career, during 2011, Maiden was Scotland's first choice wicketkeeper in CB40 and ODI matches.

After his cricketing career, Maiden worked in the banking sector in Edinburgh.

References

External links
 
 

1979 births
Living people
Scottish cricketers
Scotland One Day International cricketers
Scotland Twenty20 International cricketers
Alumni of Loughborough University
Lancashire cricketers
Cricketers from Edinburgh
Cricketers from Glasgow